The 2010–11 CONCACAF Champions League Championship Round was played from February to April 2011. A total of eight teams qualified for the Championship Round from the Group Stage.

The championship round draw was conducted on November 1, 2010, at the CONCACAF headquarters in New York City. In the quarterfinals, the group winners were assured of playing the second leg at home, and were drawn against the group runners-up, with the only restriction being that they could not face the same team that it played in the Group Stage (and thus they may face a team from the same association).

The championship round was played in knockout format. Each tie was played over two legs, and the away goals rule would be used, but not after a tie enters extra time, and so a tie would be decided by penalty shootout if the aggregate score is level after extra time.

Qualified teams

Bracket

Quarterfinals
The first legs of the Quarterfinals were played February 22–24, 2011, and the second legs were played March 1–3, 2011.

|}

All Times U.S. Eastern Standard Time (UTC−05:00)

First leg

Second leg

Cruz Azul won 5 – 1 on aggregate.

Real Salt Lake won 4 – 1 on aggregate.

Monterrey won 2 – 0 on aggregate.

Saprissa won 3 – 1 on aggregate.

Semifinals
The first legs of the Semifinals were played March 15–16, 2011, and the second legs were played April 5–6, 2011.

|}

All Times U.S. Eastern Daylight Time (UTC−04:00)

First leg

Second leg

Real Salt Lake won 3 – 2 on aggregate.

Monterrey won 3 – 2 on aggregate.

Finals

The first leg of the Final was played April 20, 2011, and the second leg was played April 27, 2011.

|}

All Times U.S. Eastern Daylight Time (UTC−04:00)

First leg

Second leg

Monterrey won 3 – 2 on aggregate.

References

External links
 CONCACAF Champions League official website

Championship Round